Gogh, The Starry Night is a Chinese-South Korean web-drama starring Kwon Yuri, Kim Young-kwang and Lee Ji-hoon. It was broadcast on Sohu TV every Saturday and Sunday at 00:00 from July 2, 2016.

The drama also aired on SBS on Saturdays and Sundays at 22:00 on October 22 as a 4-episode mini drama, after Second to Last Love ended.

Synopsis 
The web-drama depicts a story of a 29-year-old employee 'Go Ho' (Kwon Yuri) of an advertising company who works hard but hardly praised by her hot-tempered boss (Kim Young Kwang). As a result, she dislikes her boss very much, not understanding his unspoken love for her. In the meantime, her ex-boyfriend (Lee Ji-hoon) joins the same company, and she gets transferred to his work unit. The plot revolves around the two male leads trying to win the heart of Go Ho.

Cast

Main  
 Kwon Yu-ri as Go-ho
 Kim Young-kwang as Kang Tae-ho
 Lee Ji-hoon as Hwang Ji-hoon

Supporting  
 Shin Jae-ha as Oh Jung-min
 Choi Deok-moon as Director Choi Chang-seob 
 Kang Rae-yeon as Lee Hee-yeon
 Go Geon-han as Seo-won
 Kim Ji-hoon as Park Jin-woo
 Hwang Young-hee as Lee Chung-kyung (Go-ho's mother)
 Min Sung-wook as Director Seo Gook-jin
 Jang Sung-won as Go Kang (Go-ho's brother)

Guests 
 Jin Kyung as Creative Director Yoon (Ep. 1 & 13-14)
 Lee Dong-jin as Go-ho's father (Ep. 1, 14 & 18-19)
 Kim Kwang-kyu (Ep. 1-2)
 Park Seul-gi as Editor Park Seul-gi (Ep. 2 & 15)
 Lee Jong-suk as Song Dae-gi (Ep. 5)
 Park Shin-hye as convenience store cashier (Ep. 8)
 Park Joon-geum as Madam Joo (Ep. 9)
 Park Young-soo as Chef (Ep. 9)
 Yoon Kyun-sang as Police Officer (Ep. 18)

Ratings
The blue numbers represent the lowest ratings and the red numbers represent the highest ratings
NR denotes that the drama did not rank in the Top 20 daily programs on that date.

Original soundtracks

Awards and nominations

References

External links
  
  
 Gogh, The Starry Night at Kim Jong-hak Production 

Chinese web series
South Korean web series
2016 web series debuts
2016 web series endings
South Korean romantic comedy television series
Sohu original programming
Television series by Kim Jong-hak Production